Walter Pellegrini (born 30 June 1959, in Switzerland) is a retired Swiss footballer who played as a centre forward.

External links
 

1959 births
Living people
Swiss men's footballers
Association football forwards
FC Chiasso players
FC St. Gallen players
FC Zürich players
AC Bellinzona players